Nilesh Gupta (born 1974) is an Indian businessman, the managing director (MD) of Lupin Limited since September 2013.

Early life
He is the only son of Desh Bandhu Gupta, who founded Lupin in 1968. His eldest sister, Vinita D. Gupta, is the CEO.

He has a bachelor's degree in chemical engineering from the University Department of Chemical Technology, Mumbai, and an MBA from the Wharton School, University of Pennsylvania, U.S. in 2002, where he specialized in healthcare, strategic management and finance.

Career
Gupta joined Lupin in 1996, and having led the Company's research, supply chain, manufacturing, quality and regulatory operations, was made managing director in September 2013.

Gupta, along with his sister Vinita Gupta, CEO of Lupin, won "Entrepreneur of the Year" at the Forbes India Leadership Awards in 2016, and Ernst & Young Entrepreneur of the Year Award for India in 2015.

Personal life
He has a daughter and a son.

References

1970s births
Living people
Indian chemical engineers
Indian chief executives
Indian businesspeople in the pharmaceutical industry
University of Mumbai alumni
Institute of Chemical Technology alumni
Wharton School of the University of Pennsylvania alumni